Nkanyiso Madonsela (born 20 March 1991) is a South African soccer player who plays as a right midfielder for South African Premier Division club Sekhukhune United.

References

1991 births
Living people
South African soccer players
Sportspeople from Pietermaritzburg
Association football midfielders
Lamontville Golden Arrows F.C. players
Thanda Royal Zulu F.C. players
Jomo Cosmos F.C. players
Royal Eagles F.C. players
Uthongathi F.C. players
Sekhukhune United F.C. players
South African Premier Division players
National First Division players